Marsannay-la-Côte is a commune in the Côte-d'Or department in the Bourgogne-Franche-Comté region in eastern France.

Geography
Marsannay-la-Côte contains a strip of vineyards on the slope of the Côte d'Or. The vineyards are the most northerly part of the Burgundy wine region.  In the plain of the Saône to the east, large fields are visible.  The original village is now flanked by small modern housing developments.  There is 186ha of vineyards, 202ha of agricultural land and 523ha of communal woodland on the Jurassic limestone hills to the West.

The village is situated 6 km South-West of Dijon and is on the Route des Grands Crus (which loosely translates as the "road of great vineyards") that traverses the Burgundy wine region.

Climate
Marsannay-la-Côte has a oceanic climate (Köppen climate classification Cfb).

Population

Administration

Wine

Marsannay-la-Côte vineyards, which form part of Côte de Nuits, produce wine of all three colours - red (Pinot Noir), white (Chardonnay) and rosé (Pinot Noir) - which is unique for a communal appellation in the Burgundy wine region. The commune's appellation d'origine contrôlée (AOC) is called Marsannay, without la-Côte.

Twin towns — sister cities
Marsannay-la-Côte is twinned with:

  Mazy, Belgium (1958)
  Schweich, Germany (1992)

See also
 Communes of the Côte-d'Or département
 Cécile Bart (born 1958), artist based in Marsannay-la-Côte
 Pierre-Marie-Alphonse Favier (1837-1905), born in Marsannay-la-Côte

References

External links

Officiel website
Marsannay-la-Côte tourist office
Description of Marsannay-la-Côte
Château de Marsannay

Communes of Côte-d'Or